The 2017 Pac-12 Football Championship Game was played on December 1, 2017 at Levi's Stadium in Santa Clara, California to determine the champion of the Pac-12 Conference in football for the 2017 season. It was the seventh football championship game in Pac-12 Conference history. The game featured the South Division champion USC Trojans against the North Division co-champion Stanford Cardinal, a rematch of the 2015 championship and the first rematch in the game's history. USC defeated Stanford by a score of 31–28, becoming the first South Division member to win the Pac-12 Championship Game.

The game was televised nationally by ESPN.

History
This was the seventh playing of the Pac-12 Football Championship Game. Stanford, making its fourth appearance, won the 2012, 2013 and 2015 Pac-12 titles.

Teams

Stanford (North)
Stanford went into the game having won 7 of their last 10 meetings with USC.

USC (South)
USC clinched their second Pac-12 Championship game berth in three years after beating Colorado 38–24.

Game summary

Scoring Summary

See also
 List of Pac-12 Conference football champions
 Stanford–USC football rivalry

Notes
USC had the better conference record and was therefore designated as the home team. The officials for the game were: Michael Mothershed, Referee; Roscoe Meisenheimer, Umpire; Cravonne Barrett, Head Linesman; Dale Keller, Line Judge; Clay Reynard, Side Judge; Steve Currie, Field Judge; Joe Johnston, Back Judge; Randy Campbell, Center  Judge; Chuck McFerrin, Instant Replay Official; Jack Wood, Instant Replay Communicator.

References

Championship
Pac-12 Football Championship Game
Sports competitions in Santa Clara, California
American football competitions in California
Stanford Cardinal football games
USC Trojans football games
Pac-12 Football
Pac-12 Football